Joseph de Torre (May 25, 1932May 31, 2018) was a social and political philosopher and a Roman Catholic priest. He is the author of books on social ethics, Catholic social teaching, modern philosophy and spirituality. He is a member of  the Carnegie Council for Ethics in International Affairs, and the Acton Institute for the Study of Religion and Liberty. De Torre is the author of twenty books and hundreds of essays. He had been living in the Philippines since 1968.  He was fluent in Latin, Greek, Spanish and English.

Early life

De Torre was born in Madrid on 25 May 1932, and educated in Spain and Italy. He has a Bachelor of Arts from the University of Barcelona and a Masters from the Angelicum.  The then medium of instruction at the Angelicum was Latin.  Hence De Torre's fluency in the language.  From the same university, he obtained his doctorate in Philosophy. He was ordained priest in 1955 for the Opus Dei prelature, and spent the next thirteen years in Ireland and England in continuous pastoral and educational work.

Academic work

In 1968 he went to the Philippines. Since 1970 he has been teaching social ethics, social economics and modern philosophy at the Center for Research and Communication (CRC), and imparting these courses, as well as “theology for lay people” courses. He chaired the department of Philosophy at the CRC College of Arts and Sciences from 1989 to 1994, and thereafter became University Professor of Social and Political Philosophy in the University of Asia and the Pacific (formerly CRC). In June 1999 he became Professor Emeritus of the University.

In 1995 he received an award in the category of books in English of the catholic Mass Media Awards, for his book Christ and the Moral Life. In February 1989 he received an award as Outstanding Catholic Author from the 2nd Asian Catholic Bookfair.

He was consultor to the late Cardinal Julio Rosales in the Pontifical Commission for the Revision of the Code of Canon Law, to the Papal Nuncio to the Philippines, Archbishop Bruno Torpiglani, and to Cardinal Jaime Sin, who appointed him delegate to the 1979 Synod of Manila, as expert in social ethics.

He is a member of the Fellowship of Catholic Scholars (USA), the American Catholic Philosophical Association (USA), the Society of Catholic Social Scientists (USA), the American Maritain Association (USA), of the Royal Institute of Philosophy (UK), the International Society for Study of European Ideas (Haifa, Israel), the Catholic Educators Resource Center (Canada), the Carnegie Council for Ethics in International Affairs (USA), and the Acton Institute for the Study of Religion and Liberty (USA).

Publications

He has published more than twenty books and hundreds of articles and essays, since 1966, mainly on Vatican II subjects, as well as topics on social, biological, economic and political ethics, such as the person and the common good, the sacredness of human life, the family and the political community.

A book that has become a textbook is Christian Philosophy. Manila: Vera-Reyes, 1980 (Reprintings in 1981 and 1989); (332 pp.). Presentation by Jaime L. Cardinal Sin.

His books on the social ethics and the social doctrine of the Church are:

Freedom, Truth and Love: The Encyclical Centesimus Annus. Manila: SEASFI, 1992; (179 pp.).
The Church and Temporal Realities. 1st ed.: Manila: SEASFI, 1988; 2nd ed.: Manila: UA&P, 1997 (136 pp.). With a Foreword by Jaime L Cardinal Sin.
Politics and the Church: From Rerum Novarum to Liberation Theology. Manila: Vera-Reyes, 1985; (297 pp.).
Work, Culture, Liberation: The Social Teaching of the Church. Manila: Vera-Reyes, 1985 (275 pp.).
The Leaven of the Gospel in Secular Society. Manila: Sinag-tala, 1983; (120 pp.). With Presentations by Archbishop Bruno Torpigliani, former Apostolic Nuncio to the Philippines, and Archbishop Antonio Mabutas, President, Catholic Bishops Conference of the Philippines.
(ed.) Social Morals: The Church Speaks on Society. 1st ed.: 1975; 2nd ed.: Manila: SEASFI, 1987; (218 pp.). With a Foreword by Archbishop Bruno Torpigliani, former Apostolic Nuncio to the Philippines.
Person, Family and State: An Outline of Social Ethics. Manila: SEASFI, 1991; (431 pp.).
Informal Talks on Family and Society. Manila: SEASFI, 1990; (155 pp.).
The Roots of Society. The Metaphysical Ground of Social Ethics. 1st ed.: 1977; 2nd ed.: Manila: Sinag-tala, (184 pp.).
(ed.) Population Matters: A Symposium. Manila: UA&P, 2002 (152 pp.).
On spirituality, he has written:
Christ and the Moral Life. Manila: Sinag-tala, 1984; (87 pp.).
The Divinity of Jesus Christ: Summary of Fundamental Theology in the Light of Vatican II. Manila: Sinag-tala, 1984; (166 pp.). Reprinted in 2002. With a Presentation by Jaime L. Cardinal Sin.

His books on modern philosophy are:

The Humanism of Modern Philosophy. 1st ed.: Manila: SEASFI, 2nd ed.: Manila, UA&P, 1997: (349 pp.).
William James: Pragmatism, Manila: SEASFI, 1990: (111 pp.).
Marxism, Socialism and Christianity. 1st ed.: Manila: SEASFI, 1976; 2nd ed.: On the centenary of Karl Marx's death, Manila: Sinag-tala, 1983; (130 pp.). 
Contemporary Philosophical Issues in Historical Perspective, Manila: UA&P, 2000; (275 pp.). Preface by Stephen Krason.
Generation and Degeneration: A Survey of Ideologies. Manila: UA&P, 1995 (214 pp.)
Openness to Reality: Essays on Secularism and Transcendence, Manila: UA&P, 1985; (151 pp.).
Being Is Person: Personalism and Human Transcendence in Socio-Economic and Political Philosophy. Manila: UA&P, 2005; (306 pp.).

On family and bioethics, he wrote:

Sexuality and Sanctity. 1st ed.: Manila: Sinag-tala, 1988; (166 pp.). Reprinted in 2002.
(ed.) Bioethical Questions: The Teaching of John Paul II. Manila: UA&P, 1999; (492 pp.).
(ed.) The Church Speaks on Marriage and Celibacy. 1st ed.: 1976; 2nd ed.: Manila: Sinag-tala, 1984; (388 pp.)

Some excerpts from his works

In The Power of Christian Philosophy to Transform Man and Society", he states:

The scientific and technological breakthrough took place in 16th century Christian Europe, coinciding with the European evangelization and colonization of the American continent. But this breakthrough, which has accelerated at a bewildering pace ever since, did not occur out of the blue. It was the consequence of the philosophy of science elaborated by the early 13th century universities founded by the Church, in Paris, Bologna, Oxford, Naples, Padua, Cambridge, Cologne, Salamanca, etc., etc., as has been brilliantly demonstrated by Pierre Duhem and Stanley Jaki, among others.

The congenial and thorough epistemological realism of Christian philosophy led St. Thomas Aquinas, right in the middle of the 13th century, to describe the three levels of the mind's penetration into abstraction of pure quantity from them; and (3) the intellectual grasp of universal being in everything (the famous esse or actus essendi of St. Thomas Aquinas). Here was the seed of the scientific breakthrough. By joining (2) and (1), namely mathematical physics, the scientific method crystallized, namely the golden rules of (a) empirical observation, (b) experiment, and (c) quantification.

Some theologians then began to apply this method, such as Roger Bacon, Albert the Great, Robert Grosseteste, Alfred of Saxony, John Buridan and Nicholas Oresme, with remarkable discoveries in all the fields of physics, later on acknowledged by no less than Newton who said that “we stand on the shoulders of giants.”

The Thomistic method was the real cause of the scientific breakthrough, not the method advocated by Francis Bacon or that of René Descartes (both in the 17th century),since the latter reduced it to mathematical deduction (mistrusting observation and experiment), and the former reduced it to pure observation and experiment, excluding mathematics. The real creators of the scientific breakthrough, such as Leonardo da Vinci, Copernicus, Galileo and Kepler and, of course, Newton, followed the three golden rules formulated by St. Thomas Aquinas, ignoring the philosophical controversies between rationalists and empiricists, as well as gradually purging science of all magic, superstition and mythology.

References

External links
Fr. Joseph de Torre's Publication Site
Articles of Joseph de Torre in Catholic Educator's Resource

1932 births
2018 deaths
People from Madrid
Social philosophers
20th-century Spanish philosophers
Political philosophers
Catholic philosophers
Thomists
Opus Dei members
Spanish expatriates in the Philippines
University of Barcelona alumni